The Real Ramona is a studio album by Throwing Muses, released in 1991. It peaked at number 26 on the UK Albums Chart.

Reception

NME named The Real Ramona the 35th best album of 1991. In a retrospective review, Andrzej Lukowski of BBC Music wrote that, with The Real Ramona, Throwing Muses wrote an "album of great pop songs, but when they did so they no way surrendered their intrinsic otherness – two decades of indie-pop later, it still sounds arresting.

Track listing

Personnel
Credits adapted from liner notes.

Throwing Muses
 Kristin Hersh – guitars, vocals
 Tanya Donelly – guitars, vocals
 Fred Abong – bass guitar
 David Narcizo – drums

Technical personnel
 Dennis Herring – production
 John Beverly Jones – engineering
 Csaba Petocz – re-mixing on "Not Too Soon"
 Paul Q. Kolderie – re-mixing on "Red Shoes"
 Throwing Muses – re-mixing on "Red Shoes"
 Doug Sax – mastering
 David Narcizo – design
 Jim Anderson – front photography
 Andy Catlin – band photography

Charts

References

External links
 
 

1991 albums
Throwing Muses albums
Albums produced by Dennis Herring
4AD albums
Sire Records albums